The Rehbinder effect in physics is the reduction in the hardness and ductility of a material, particularly metals, by a surfactant film.

A proposed explanation for this effect is the disruption of surface oxide films, and the reduction of surface energy by surfactants. 

The effect is of particular importance in machining, as lubricants reduce cutting forces.

References

Further reading

 

Condensed matter physics
Surface science